SS Pennsylvania was a transatlantic liner that was launched in Ireland in 1896 and spent most of her career with Hamburg America Line (HAPAG). She was the first of a class of four HAPAG sister ships that were built in the United Kingdom and Germany between 1896 and 1899.

In 1917 the US Government seized Pennsylvania and renamed her Nansemond. She was a troop ship with the Army Transport Service until the end of the First World War. In 1919 the US Navy operated her as the troop ship USS Nansemond (ID-1395).

In August 1919 the Navy returned Nansemond to the United States Shipping Board, who had her converted to a cargo-only ship. She was scrapped in 1924.

Building
Harland and Wolff built Pennsylvania in Belfast, launching her on 10 September 1896 and completing her on 30 January 1897.

Harland and Wolff built Pennsylvania as a three-class ship. She originally had berths for 162 passengers in first class, 197 in second class and 2,382 in third class.

Pennsylvania had twin propellers, each driven by a  four-cylinder quadruple-expansion steam engine.

HAPAG registered Arcadia in Hamburg. Her code letters were RKPB.

Sister ships followed Pennsylvania from German shipyards. AG Vulcan Stettin built  in 1899.

Pennsylvania
On 30 January 1897 Pennsylvania began her maiden voyage from Belfast to New York. Her regular route was between New York and Hamburg.

On 24 September 1902 Pennsylvania rescued all 13 crew from the Norwegian barque Bothnia, who had been struggling against rising water for 17 days. On 8 March 1910 Pennsylvania accidentally rammed the Hamburg-registered schooner Gertrud in the mouth of the Elbe, killing five of the schooner's six crew.

After the collision, Pennsylvania was refitted as a two-class ship, with berths for 404 second class and 2,200 third class passengers.

After a number of test flights the flight deck was removed.

By 1913 Pennsylvania was equipped for wireless telegraphy. Her call sign was DDN.

On 18 July 1914, amid the July Crisis in Europe, Pennsylvania left Hamburg for New York. In the first week of August the First World War began, so Pennsylvania remained in the neutral US.

Nansemond
On 6 April 1917 The US declared war on Germany. The US Shipping Board seized Pennsylvania and renamed her Nansemond. She was given two 6-inch/40-caliber guns and two 3-inch/50-caliber guns as defensive armament. For the remainder of the war the Army Transport Service used Nansemond as a troop ship. The cargoes she carried from the US to Europe included railroad locomotives.

Late in November 1918 Nansemond left Saint-Nazaire in France carrying 16 Medical Corps personnel and 148 patients suffering from shell shock. She reached a US port on 7 December, five days late.

At Hoboken, New Jersey on 20 January 1919 Nansemond was commissioned into the US Navy with the pennant number ID-1395 and code letters GJBN. Lt Cdr W McLeod, USNRF, was appointed to command her, and she was assigned to the Naval Overseas Transportation Service. For Navy service she was repainted with a black hull and funnel, white superstructure and yellow masts.

On 4 February Nansemond left New York carrying Army supplies, and on 16 February she reached St-Nazaire. On 26 February she left St-Nazaire carrying members of the American Expeditionary Forces, and on 11 March she reached Newport News, Virginia. She spent the next five months crossing and re-crossing the North Atlantic, making a round trip every 32 days.

On 28 June Nansemond left Brest, France carrying members of the 802nd Pioneer Infantry, which was an African-American unit. Also aboard was Frank Monroe Upton, a US Navy ensign who had been awarded the Congressional Medal of Honor.

On 23 August 1919 Nansemond reached New York from Brest carrying 2,327 troops. On 25 August the Navy decommissioned her and returned her to the US Shipping Board the same day.

Fate
The USSB sent Nansemond to the National Dry Dock and Repair Company to be converted into a cargo-only ship. A strike or strikes delayed the work, which was not completed until 19 December. The USSB retained Cox & Stevens to prepare plans for new cabin and steerage accommodation, but did not commission the refit to be undertaken.

The USSB at first allocated Nansemond to American Line. The Board then bareboat chartered her to the Army Transport Service, which operated her between Antwerp and New York.

Nansemond was then laid up with other USSB ships in the lower Hudson River. She was scrapped in 1924 in Baltimore by the Boston Iron and Metals Company.

References

1897 ships
Auxiliary ships of the United States Navy
Maritime incidents in 1902
Maritime incidents in 1910
Ocean liners
Passenger ships of Germany
Ships built in Belfast
Ships built by Harland and Wolff
Ships of the Hamburg America Line
Steamships of Germany
Steamships of the United States
Transport ships of the United States Army
World War I passenger ships of Germany